Columbia University is the historical and colloquial name of Columbia University in the City of New York.

Columbia University may also refer to:

Columbia College, the oldest undergraduate school of Columbia University
The University of Portland, formerly known as Columbia University

See also
Columbia College (disambiguation)
 Columbian College, former name of George Washington University
National University of Colombia, in Colombia, South America
South Colombian University, in Colombia, South America
University of British Columbia, in Vancouver and Kelowna, British Columbia